Love in Stereo may refer to:

 "Love in Stereo" (song), a 2008 song by Ola Svensson
 Love in Stereo (Rahsaan Patterson album), 1999
 Love in Stereo (Carmen Reece album), 2010, or its title track
 "Love in Stereo", a 1979 song by The Monks from Bad Habits
 "Love in Stereo", a 1990 song by Warrant from Cherry Pie
 "Love in Stereo", a 2008 song by Donnie Klang from Just a Rolling Stone
 "Love in Stereo", a 2013 song by Sky Ferreira from Night Time, My Time